This article gives a list of United States network television schedules including prime time (since 1946), daytime (since 1947), late night (since 1950), overnight (since 2020), morning (since 2021), and afternoon (since 2021). The variously three to six larger commercial U.S. television networks each has its schedule. which is altered each year (and usually more frequently), and the introductions and relevant articles provide a comprehensive review for each year, from the 1946 season to the present. 

Public broadcasting in the U.S. has often been more decentralized, and less likely to have a single network feed appear across most of the country (though some latter-day public networks such as World Channel and Create have had more in-pattern clearance than National Educational Television or its successor PBS have had). Also, local stations can and have deviated occasionally or frequently from commercial network schedules for a variety of reasons.

1940s

1950s

1960s

1970s

1980s

1990s

2000s

2010s

2020s

United States late night network television schedules